Red Line Synthetic Oil is a synthetic lubricant manufacturer located in Benicia, California, United States. It is part of Phillips 66 Spectrum Corporation.

History
Red Line was founded in 1979 by Tim Kerrigan and Peter Filice in Novato, California. As it grew, it moved to Martinez, California, and then to Benicia, California.

In 1986, Roy Howell, a Cornell graduate and chemist working for Lubrizol, was appointed as Chief Chemist at Red Line Synthetic Oil Corporation.

In 2014, Spectrum Corporation (parent to Red Line) was acquired by Phillips 66.

Products

Red Line started as a company producing oils for the racing industry, later expanding their business to the more mainstream markets.  They have a full line up of multigrade and monograde polyol ester base stock (Group V) engine and gear lubricants.

Racing
Starting in 2009, they are the official oil for the Formula Mazda Challenge series  Other partnerships and contingency programs include Drag racing, Road Racing, Time Attack, Pro Stock Bike racing, and Motorcycle racing.

Red Line Synthetic Oil sponsored touring car racer Eddie Garrison in the Grand Bayou Race Series in 2007.  Red Line also sponsored Doug Kalitta's NHRA Top Fuel Dragster beginning in 2009  and Stillen's Rally-Spec Nissan GT-R.

References

External links
 

Motor oils
Chemical companies of the United States